The 2005 Meteor Music Awards was hosted by comedian Ed Byrne at the Point Theatre on Thursday 24 February 2005. It was the fifth edition of Ireland's national music awards. A total of sixteen awards were presented at the ceremony, with the public eligible to vote in five categories. Snow Patrol won two awards (Best Irish Band and Best Irish Album for Final Straw), whilst Franz Ferdinand also picked up two awards (Best International Band and Best International Album for Franz Ferdinand). Paddy Casey and Juliet Turner were named Best Irish Male and Best Irish Female. The Chalets won Best New Band.

Performances 
There were performances on the night from Westlife, Snow Patrol, Aslan, The Thrills, Bell X1 and The Devlins.

Nominations 
The nominations were announced on 11 January 2005.

Public voting categories

Best Irish Band 
Bell X1
Blink
Future Kings of Spain
Snow Patrol
The Frames
The Thrills

Best Irish Male 
Paddy Casey
David Kitt
Brian McFadden
Mundy
Declan O'Rourke
Damien Rice

Best Irish Female 
Sinéad O'Connor
Juliet Turner
Ann Scott
Eleanor Shanley
Cathy Davey
Bronagh Gallagher

Best Irish Pop Act 
Westlife
The Corrs
Brian McFadden
Carol Anthony
Ronan Keating
D-Side

Best Irish DJ 
Alison Curtis – Today FM
Ray D'Arcy – Today FM
Ian Dempsey – Today FM
Tom Dunne – Today FM
Dave Fanning – RTÉ 2fm
Jenny Huston – RTÉ 2fm
Ryan Tubridy – RTÉ 2fm

Non-public voting categories

Best Irish Album 
Burn the Maps – The Frames
Deep Inside the Sound of Sadness – Blink
Final Straw – Snow Patrol
Let's Bottle Bohemia – The Thrills
Raining Down Arrows – Mundy
Since Kyabram – Declan O'Rourke

Best Folk/Traditional 
Kíla
Mary McPartlan
George Murphy
Declan O'Rourke
Planxty
Pauline Scanlon

Best International Male 
Eminem
George Michael
Morrissey
Usher
Kanye West
Robbie Williams

Best International Female 
Anastacia
Natasha Bedingfield
PJ Harvey
Kylie Minogue
Bic Runga
Joss Stone

Best International Album 
Aha Shake Heartbreak – Kings of Leon
American Idiot – Green Day
Hopes and Fears  – Keane
Hot Fuss – The Killers
Scissor Sisters – Scissor Sisters
Franz Ferdinand – Franz Ferdinand

Best International Group 
Franz Ferdinand
Keane
The Killers
OutKast
R.E.M.
Scissor Sisters

Best Live Performance Visiting Act 
Franz Ferdinand
The Killers
Madonna
Metallica
Pixies
Red Hot Chili Peppers

Hope for 2005 
Angel of Mons

Lifetime Achievement Award 
Aslan

Humanitarian Award 
Adi Roche – in recognition of her work with the children of Chernobyl

Industry Award 
John Hughes

Multiple nominations 
Despite receiving three nominations, Declan O'Rourke won nothing. Franz Ferdinand and Snow Patrol were multiple award winners in two categories.

 3 – Franz Ferdinand
 3 – The Killers
 3 – Declan O'Rourke
 2 – Blink
 2 – The Frames
 2 – Keane
 2 – Mundy
 2 – Scissor Sisters
 2 – Snow Patrol
 2 – The Thrills

References

External links 
 Official site
 MCD Promotions
 List of winners through the years
 Photos

Meteor Music Awards
Meteor Awards